FC Vestsjælland, also known as FCV Vikings, was a professional Danish association football club that played in the Danish 1st Division until its closure in 2015. They played their home matches at Harboe Arena Slagelse in Slagelse, which has a capacity of 10,000 (3,300 seats).

History
FC Vestsjælland was founded in January 2008 as the professional structure comprising the first team of the mother club, Slagelse B&I (SBI). On 9 December 2015, FC Vestsjælland was declared bankrupt.

Achievements
1st Division
Runner-up (1): 2012–13
2nd Division East
Winners (1): 2008–09
Danish Cup
Runner-up (1): 2015

Seasons
2 seasons in the Danish Superliga
5 seasons in the Danish 1st Division
1 seasons in the Danish 2nd Division

Past seasons

Kit and sponsoring
Kit manufacturer and sponsoring for FCV.

First kit evolution
The club's colors are generated from the club's logo which are red and blue.

Staff

Management

 Chairman: Kurt Andersen
 Vice-President: Villum Christensen
 Board Director: Bernd Griese
 Board Member: Michael V. Nielsen
 General Administrative Manager: Gert Hansen
 Director of Football: Jacob "Gaxe" Gregersen

Sports

 Head Coach & Director of Sports: Michael Hemmingsen
 Assistant Coach: Janus Blond
 Goalkeeping Coach: Henrik Zarp 
 Coordinator: Steen Hansen
 Advisor: Jens Lund
 Account Manager: Brian Nielsen
 Talent Manager U12 – U19: Jeppe Tengbjerg
 Head Coach U17: Mohammed Salem

Medical

 Team Doctor: Søren Daugaard
 Masseur: Per Pfeiffer
 Physio: Tomas Monty Sundman
 Mental Coach: Renè Nielsen

Last squad

Former coaches

 Jeppe Tengbjerg (July 1, 2008 – March 31, 2009)
 Michael Schjønberg (April 1, 2009 – Feb 16, 2010)
 Ove Pedersen (July 1, 2011 – May 21, 2014)
 Michael Hansen (May 23, 2014 – Sep 1, 2015)
 Michael Hemmingsen (September 3, 2015 – November 30)

Player of the season
 2014–15:  Rasmus Festersen

References

External links

Official Site
Slagelse B&I
FCV Vikings Divisionsholdet

 
Defunct football clubs in Denmark
Association football clubs established in 2008
Association football clubs disestablished in 2015
2008 establishments in Denmark
FC Vestsjaelland